Gong Maoxin and Zhang Ze were the defending champions but chose not to defend their title.

Gao Xin and Sun Fajing won the title after defeating Marc Polmans and Scott Puodziunas 2–6, 6–4, [10–7] in the final.

Seeds

Draw

References

External links
 Main draw

Shanghai Challenger - Doubles
2019 Doubles